The following outline is provided as an overview of and topical guide to fish:

Fish – any member of a paraphyletic group of organisms that consist of all gill-bearing aquatic craniate animals that lack limbs with digits.  Included in this definition are the living hagfish, lampreys, and cartilaginous and bony fish, as well as various extinct related groups. Most fish are ectothermic ("cold-blooded"), allowing their body temperatures to vary as ambient temperatures change, though some of the large active swimmers like white shark and tuna can hold a higher core temperature.  Fish are abundant in most bodies of water. They can be found in nearly all aquatic environments, from high mountain streams (e.g., char and gudgeon) to the abyssal and even hadal depths of the deepest oceans (e.g., cusk-eel and snailfish). At 32,000 species, fish exhibit greater species diversity than any other group of vertebrates.

What type of things are fish? 

Fish can be described as all of the following:

 Natural resource
 Organisms
 Animals –
Vertebrates
 Seafood

Types of fish 
 List of fish common names
 List of fish families
 Predator fish
 billfish
 mackerel
 salmon
 sharks
 tuna
 Forage fish
 anchovy
 herring
 sardine
 Demersal fish
 cod
 flatfish
 pollock
 rays
 Other types
 Aquarium fish
 Bait fish
 Coarse fish
 Farmed fish
 Game fish
 Oily fish
 Rough fish
 Whitefish

History of fish 

 History of fishing
 Prehistoric fish

Fish biology 
 Ichthyology
 Ichthyology terms
 Ethnoichthyology
 Diversity of fish

Fish anatomy 
Fish anatomy
 Ampullae of Lorenzini
 Anguilliformity
 Barbel
 Dorsal fin
 Electroreception
 Gill
 Gill raker
 Gill slit
 Glossohyal
 Hyomandibula
 Lateral line
 Leydig's organ
 Mauthner cell
 Otolith (Bone used for determining the age of a fish)
 Operculum
 Pharyngeal teeth
 Photophore
 Pseudobranch
 Scales
 Shark cartilage
 Shark tooth
 Swim bladder
 Vision
 Weberian apparatus

Fish reproduction 
Fish reproduction
 Bubble nest
 Clasper
 Egg case
 Fish development
 Ichthyoplankton
 Milt
 Mouthbrooder
 Roe
 Spawning
 Spawning triggers

Fish locomotion 

Fish locomotion
 Fin and flipper locomotion
 Amphibious fish
 Walking fish
 Flying fish
 Undulatory locomotion

Fish behavior 
 Aquatic predation
 Bait ball
 Bottom feeders
 Cleaner fish
 Diel vertical migration
 Electric fish
 Filter feeders
 Forage fish
 Hallucinogenic fish
 Migrating fish
 Paedophagy
 Pain in fish
 Predatory fish
 Salmon run
 Sardine run
 Scale eaters
 Schooling fish
 Venomous fish

Fish habitats 

 Coastal fish
 Coldwater fish
 Coral reef fish
 Deep sea fish
 Demersal fish
 Freshwater fish
 Groundfish
 Marine habitats
 Pelagic fish
 Tropical fish
 Wild fish

Fish as a resource 
 Natural resource
 Fish as food
 Fish farming
 Aquaculture
 Fishing industry
 Fisheries
 Fishing

Fish conservation 
Fish conservation
 Overfishing
 Habitat destruction
 Environmental effects of fishing

Fish-related recreation 
 Fishkeeping
 Recreational fishing
 Angling

Fish-related organizations 
 American Society of Ichthyologists and Herpetologists
 Gilbert Ichthyological Society
 Ichthyological Society of Hong Kong
 National Fish Habitat Initiative
 North American Native Fishes Association

Fish-related publications 
 Fishes of the World

People influential in relation to fish 

 Jacques Cousteau
 William Beebe – first biologist to observe deep-sea animals in their native environment.
 Edwin Philip Pister
 Carl Leavitt Hubbs
 David Starr Jordan
 Louis Agassiz
 Robert Rush Miller
 Wendell L. Minckley

See also 

 Public aquarium
 Aquarium
 Catch and release
 Deep sea fish
 Digital Fish Library
 Fish development
 Fishkeeping
 Forage fish
 Ichthyology
 Marine biology
 Marine vertebrates
 Fear of fish
 Fish kill
 Fish on stamps
 FishBase
 Genetically modified fish
 Schreckstoff

References

External links 

 ANGFA – Illustrated database of freshwater fishes of Australia and New Guinea
 Fischinfos.de – Illustrated database of the freshwater fishes of Germany 
 FishBase online – Comprehensive database with information on over 29,000 fish species
 Fisheries and Illinois Aquaculture Center – Data outlet for fisheries and aquaculture research center in the central US
 Philippines Fishes – Database with thousands of Philippine Fishes photographed in natural habitat
 The Native Fish Conservancy – Conservation and study of North American freshwater fishes
 United Nations – Fisheries and Aquaculture Department: Fish and seafood utilization
 University of Washington Libraries Digital Collections – Digital collection of freshwater and marine fish images

 
Fish
Fish